Rocket City United (RCU) was an American soccer team based in Huntsville, Alabama, United States. Founded in 2007, the team formerly played in the National Premier Soccer League (NPSL), a national amateur league at the fourth tier of the American Soccer Pyramid, in the Southeast Division. Rocket City United announced it would go on hiatus and not field a team for the 2015 NPSL season. The franchise was subsequently replaced by other clubs and later folded. A youth academy program that was connected to Rocket City United still continues under the same name.

The team played its home games at John Hunt Soccer Stadium in Huntsville, Alabama. Home games were also played at Madison City Schools Stadium in Madison, Alabama from 2010 to 2012. The team's colors were red, black, and white.

History

Year-by-year

Honors
 NPSL Southeast Division Champions 2009

Head coaches
  Greg Petersen (2008–2009)
  Desmond Armstrong (2010)
  Gerry Cleary (2011–2014)
  Jacob Letsholo (2014)

Stadia
 John Hunt Soccer Stadium; Huntsville, Alabama (2008–09, 2013–14)
 Jack Allen Soccer Complex; Decatur, Alabama (2 games) (2008)
 Madison City Schools Stadium; Madison, Alabama (2010–12)

References

External links

National Premier Soccer League teams
Sports in Huntsville, Alabama
Soccer clubs in Alabama
2007 establishments in Alabama
Association football clubs established in 2007